Gino Floyd "Nino" Durden (born May 5, 1963) is a former American police officer in the Los Angeles Police Department Community Resources Against Street Hoodlums (CRASH) unit implicated in the LAPD Rampart scandal. Durden, along with Officer Rafael Pérez, was involved in the shooting and framing of gang member Javier Ovando. Both officers later made false statements against Ovando in court.

Arrest and charges
Durden was arrested in July 2000. According to media reports, like the other officers directly involved, Durden was booked wearing his LAPD uniform.

Durden was charged with attempted murder, assault with a semiautomatic firearm in the Ovando shooting, filing a false report and perjury – two counts stemming from the October 25, 1996, arrest of Miguel Hernandez, who was allegedly framed on a weapons offense, second-degree robbery for allegedly stealing jewelry and money from a suspected drug dealer on August 15, 1997, and filing a false report in connection with the February 2, 1997, arrest of Jose Lara, who also was allegedly framed on a weapons charge.

Durden pleaded guilty to all charges and was sentenced to five years in prison on six California state charges, including perjury, filing false police reports and conspiracy to obstruct justice, on August 6, 2002. The sentence was served concurrently with a three-year sentence for federal charges of civil rights violations and possession of an illegal firearm. He was released on April 22, 2005 and placed on parole.

Media
Throughout the timeline of the incidents reported in the Rampart investigation, Durden was working in the LAPD's South Bureau (South Los Angeles) and had worked there since 1997, after the arrest of fellow LAPD officer Rafael Pérez. He was featured in several episodes of the FOX series LAPD: Life On the Beat before his involvement in the scandal became known.

References

1963 births
Living people
American people convicted of assault
American people convicted of attempted murder
People convicted of obstruction of justice
American perjurers
American police officers convicted of crimes
American prisoners and detainees
Criminals from California
Los Angeles Police Department officers
Criminals from Los Angeles
Police officers convicted of planting evidence
Prisoners and detainees of California